Converts to Shia Islam or commonly known as enlightened (mustabsir) refers to people who have been sure about the justice done by Ali and his descendants as well as studying the Shia thoughts, finally convert to Shia Islam and testify the position of Muhammad prophet's family.

From Sunni Islam

Malcolm Shabazz -the son of Qubilah Shabazz, the second daughter of Malcolm X and Betty Shabazz
Kabir Bello – Nigerian football striker
Qasim Umar Sokoto -a contributor to the Islamic Movement of Nigeria, the prayer leader and Islamic teacher in Sokoto, the Northern city of Nigeria
Tajul Muluk -a Shia religious leader of Madura Island, Indonesia
Edoardo Agnelli -the eldest child and only son of Gianni Agnelli, the industrialist patriarch of Fiat

Ibrahim Zakzaky -an outspoken and foremost Shi'a Muslim cleric in Nigeria
Hasan Shahhata -Shi'a Muslim cleric in egypt
Muhammad al-Tijani -a Tunisian Shia Islamic scholar, academic and theologian
Abdullah al-Dahdouh -Shi'a Muslim cleric from Morocco
Mujahid Abdul-Karim -an African-American convert to Islam, who is best known for his involvement and "spearheading" of the 26 April 1992 Watts Gang Truce
Abdillahi Nassir -a Shia cleric based in Mombasa, Kenya
Riad Al Solh -the first prime minister of Lebanon after the country's independence
Al-Qadi al-Nu'man -an Isma'ili jurist and the official historian of the Fatimid caliphs
Ali al-Sulayhi -the founder and sultan of the Sulayhid dynasty in Yemen
Shaykh Junayd
Öljaitü-the eighth Ilkhanid dynasty ruler from 1304 to 1316 in Tabriz
Ali Adil Shah I -the fifth Sultan of Bijapur Sultanate
Fateh Shah of Shah Mir Dynasty was Converted to Shia in 1505 in Kashmir.
Muhammad Raheel Hassan, a British-Pakistani Chartered Certified Accountant who works as a senior auditor in the United Kingdom.

From Christianity

Hamid Algar – Professor Hamid Algar, Ph.D, born in England in 1940, is a well known scholar and convert to Shia Islam, received his Ph.D. in oriental studies from Cambridge
Marzieh Hashemi – an American-Iranian journalist and television presenter. She is a natural-born citizen of the United States and a naturalized citizen of the Islamic Republic of Iran
Gary Legenhausen – an American philosopher who teaches at the Imam Khomeini Education and Research Institute
Rebecca Masterton – a British Islamic scholar, educator, public speaker, academic, author, television presenter, and philosopher of the Shia Islam
Christian Bonaud – (Yaḥyā Bonaud) was a French Islamologist, philosopher, writer, translator, commentator of the Qur'an in French, and a professor at the Jāmī Theological Center at Al-Mustafa International University in Iran.
Dawud Salahuddin
Khosrow Khan Gorji – a eunuch of Armenian origin, who became an influential figure in Qajar Iran  
Qarachaqay Khan – a military commander in Safavid Iran of Armenian origin
Shemavon of Agulis
Khosrow Soltan Armani – a 17th-century Safavid official, military commander, and gholam of Armenian origin
Allahverdi Khan – an Iranian general and statesman of Georgian origin
Amir Beg Armani – a 17th-century Safavid official, courtier, and gholam of Armenian origin
Aliqoli Jadid-ol-Eslam (António de Jesus) – a Portuguese figure in 17th century
Tara Fares – an Iraqi model and beauty blogger who was murdered in Baghdad on 27 September 2018

From Eastern Orthodoxy 
Abdullah Beg of Kartli – a Georgian royal prince (batonishvili) of the House of Mukhrani of the Bagrationi dynasty
Ali Mirza of Kakheti – a prince of the Georgian Bagrationi dynasty of the Kingdom of Kakheti
Abd-ol-Ghaffar Amilakhori
Bijan Beg Saakadze
Constantine I of Kakheti
David XI of Kartli
Heraclius I of Kakheti
Parsadan Gorgijanidze
Jesse of Kakheti
Manouchehr Khan Gorji
Simon I of Kartli
Simon II of Kartli
Siyavosh Beg (qollar-aghasi)
Iase Tushi
Vakhtang V of Kartli

Others
Fábio Carvalho – a Brazilian–Portuguese goalkeeper who last played for Esteghlal Khuzestan in Iran Pro League
Bruce Conde – a US Army officer, stamp collector, royal imposter, and a general for Royalist forces during the North Yemen Civil War
Antonio Inoki
Abdul Kadir (politician)
Samir Kuntar
Leila Rajabi
Sean Stone
Begum Om Habibeh Aga Khan

See also

List of converts to Islam
Twelver
Shia Islam

References

External links 

 The Enlightened to Shia Islam Centre (mostabserin website)
Reborn program on AHLULBAYT TV about the enlightened to Shia Islam

Further reading 

 كتاب التحول المذهبي بحث تحليلي حول رحلة المستبصرين إلى مذهب أهل البيت تأليف الشيخ علاء الحسون (arabic)

 Converts
Islam-related lists
Converts to Shia Islam from Sunni Islam